This is a list of hospitals in France with sorting by city and name. As of 2004, about 62% of French hospital capacity was met by publicly owned and managed hospitals. The remaining capacity was split evenly (18% each) between non-profit sector hospitals (which are linked to the public sector and which tend to be owned by foundations, religious organizations or mutual-insurance associations) and by for-profit institutions. Because the insurance is compulsory, the system is effectively financed by general taxation rather than traditional insurance (as typified by auto or home insurance, where risk levels determine premiums).

Hospitals in France

French Overseas departments and regions
Hospitals in Mayotte:
Hospital du Sud
Dispensary De Sada
Hospital De Dzaoudzi
Medical Center Proximity M'tsangamouji

Hospitals in Martinique
Martinique University Hospital (CHU)

Hospitals in Réunion: 
Hospital Félix-Guyon
Hospital Saint-Louis
Hospital Sud Du Tampon
St-Pierre Hospital

See also
Health in France
Health care in France
History of hospitals
History of medicine in France

References

 Hospitals
Hospitals
France
Hospitals
France